was the pen-name of a Japanese literary critic, active in Taishō period Japan. His real name was Kuriyagawa Tatsuo.

Early life 

Kuriyagawa Hakuson was born in Kyoto. He graduated from Tokyo Imperial University, where he had studied under Koizumi Yakumo and Natsume Sōseki, and later became a professor at Kumamoto University and Kyoto Imperial University. He lectured on 19th century Western literature, and criticized traditional Japanese writing on naturalism and romanticism. His writings include: Kindai bungaku jikko ("Ten Aspects of Modern Literature", 1912), Zoge no to o dete ("Leave the Ivory Tower!", 1920) and Kindai no ren-aikan ("Modern Views on Love", 1922).

In Kindai no ren-aikan Hakuson regarded "love marriage" (renai kekkon) to be a practice indicating an advanced nation and society, as opposed to the practice of arranged marriage, which was more commonly practiced in Japan at the time.

He was killed by a tsunami, which swept away his cottage near the beach in Kamakura, Kanagawa prefecture, during the Great Kantō earthquake of 1923.

See also

 Japanese literature
 List of Japanese authors

References 

 McDougall, Bonnie S. The Introduction of Western Literary Theories into Modern China, 1919–1925 Bulletin of the School of Oriental and African Studies, University of London, Vol. 35, No. 3 (1972), pp. 656–657

External links 
 
 ex-texts of works at Aozora Bunko

1880 births
1923 deaths
Deaths in tsunamis
Japanese writers
Japanese literary critics
Natural disaster deaths in Japan
People from Kyoto
University of Tokyo alumni
Victims of the 1923 Great Kantō earthquake